Joe Pickett (born 1956) was an American politician from the state of Texas.

Joe Pickett or Joseph Pickett may also refer to:

 Joseph Pickett (painter), an American painter
 Joe Pickett, a fictional character in the eponymous series of novels by C. J. Box
 Joe Pickett (TV series), a 2021 American television series based on the novels